Licnoptera is a monotypic moth genus in the family Erebidae. Its only species, Licnoptera crocodora, is found in New Guinea. Both the genus and species were described by Edward Meyrick in 1889.

References

External links

Nudariina
Moths described in 1889
Monotypic moth genera